Riverside, Indiana may refer to:

 Riverside, Fountain County, Indiana, an unincorporated community
 Riverside, Indianapolis, a historical neighborhood
 Riverside, LaPorte County, Indiana, an unincorporated community in Dewey Township
 Riverside, Wells County, Indiana, an unincorporated community in Harrison Township

See also
 Riverside Amusement Park (Indianapolis)
 Riverside Park (Indianapolis)